The National Space Centre or Pusat Angkasa Negara is a Malaysia space launch facility centre. This  centre is located at Sungai Lang near Banting, Selangor and is managed by the Malaysian National Space Agency (ANGKASA).

Features
Mission Control Centre
Space launch facilities (Future)

Kuala Langat District
Space program of Malaysia